Lloyd Snelgrove  (born March 27, 1956) is a Canadian politician, who represented the electoral district of Vermilion-Lloydminster in the Legislative Assembly of Alberta. He was a member of the Progressive Conservative Party.

Political career
Snelgrove was elected in the 2001 Alberta general election in the district of Vermilion-Lloydminster as a member of the Progressive Conservative Party of Alberta, and was subsequently re-elected in the 2004 and 2008 elections. Snelgrove briefly served as Minister of Finance under the government of Ed Stelmach. He decided to leave the Progressive Conservative caucus on January 27, 2012 and sit is an Independent after becoming disenchanted with Premier Alison Redford.

References

External links
Profile at the Legislative Assembly of Alberta

Progressive Conservative Association of Alberta MLAs
Living people
1956 births
Members of the Executive Council of Alberta
21st-century Canadian politicians
Finance ministers of Alberta